Events in the year 1944 in Norway.

Incumbents
Government in Exile (in London)
 Monarch – Haakon VII
 Prime Minister – Johan Nygaardsvold (Labour Party)
German Military Governor
 Reichskommissar in Norway – Josef Terboven
German Puppet Government in Oslo
 Minister-President – Vidkun Quisling (National Unification)

Events

 3 April – The German battleship  was bombed and damaged by British carrier-borne aircraft at Kåfjorden in Alta.
 20 April – The German ammunition transport Voorbode accidentally explodes in the harbour of the Western Norway city of Bergen, killing around 160 people and leaving some 5,000 homeless.
 3 October – Soviet troops cross the border to Norway.
 4 October – British aircraft bomb the U-boat bunker "Bruno" and the dock area in Bergen harbour. As a result, 194 civilians, including 60 children, are killed.
 25 October – the Petsamo–Kirkenes Offensive the Red Army liberates Kirkenes, the first town in Norway to be liberated.
 28 October – Hitler orders the German forces to withdraw from northern Norway. The Germans were determined to leave nothing of value to the Soviets, as Hitler had ordered to leave the area devoid of people, shelter and supplies.
 29 October – The Laksevåg borough of Bergen was bombed again. 52 civilians were killed.
 10 November – The first Norwegian troops (300 men from the brigade in Scotland) arrive in Finnmark.
 12 November – 29 Royal Air Force Avro Lancaster bombers sink the German battleship Tirpitz anchored in a fjord at Tromsø, with 12,000 lb Tallboy bombs.
 27 November – The German prisoner ship Rigel is sunk off Sandnessjøen by Fleet Air Arm bombers in the deadliest ship disaster in Norwegian history.
 31 December – Allied bombers tried to bomb the Victoria Terrasse building in Oslo, which was used as the Gestapo headquarters, but missed the target and instead hit civilian targets. 77 civilians are killed.

Popular culture

Music 

Song of Norway by Robert Wright and George Forrest, adapted from the music of Edvard Grieg

Film
Brudekronen, directed by Walter Fyrst

Literature

Notable births

January
 
 
 

5 January 
Eystein Eggen, writer (died 2010).
Eirin Faldet, politician.
Ørnulf Opdahl, painter.
6 January 
Ørnulf Andresen, cyclist.
Mona Lyngar, novelist.
7 January – Arne Scheie, sports commentator.
9 January – Roy Hellvin, jazz pianist.
13 January – Terje Steen, ice hockey player (died 2020).
14 January – Jan Aas, footballer (died 2016).
15 January – Lars Albert Wensell, civil servant and diplomat.
18 January – Kjersti Ericsson, psychologist, poet and politician.
23 January – Kjell Georg Lund, race walker.
24 January – Kåre Hovda, biathlete (died 1999).

February
3 February – Bjørn Johansen, ice hockey player.
7 February – Bjørn Morisse, musician, illustrator and comics creator (died 2006).
10 February – Rakel Surlien, judge, civil servant and politician.
13 February – Lasse Efskind, speed skater, medical doctor and writer.
20 February – Erik Fjeldstad, ice hockey player (died 2019).
21 February – Harald Sunde, international soccer player and coach
22 February – Karsten Isachsen, Lutheran priest and non-fiction writer (died 2016).
23 February – Per Martin Sunde, alpine skier.
24 February 
Bjørn Aamodt, poet (died 2006).
Terje Sandkjær, politician.
26 February – Arne Henriksen, architect.

March
 
 

3 March – Arvid Knutsen, soccer player and coach (died 2009)
6 March – Jarmund Øyen, politician
11 March – Øyvind Grøn, physicist
12 March – Fredrik Engelstad, sociologist
15 March 
Jørun Drevland, politician
Knut Hendriksen, opera director (died 2020).
Roger Hverven, handball player.
17 March – Arne Strand, journalist and newspaper editor.
20 March – Jan Erik Weber, oceanographer.
22 March – Rigmor Kofoed-Larsen, politician
26 March – Per Werenskiold, sailor.
30 March – Bjarne Johannes Hope, civil servant (died 2006)
31 March – Oddvar Flæte, county governor.

April
 
 
 
 

3 April – Steinar Imsen, historian and professor.
5 April – Arne Risa, long-distance runner
6 April – Halvor Stenstadvold, business person and politician.
7 April – Jorunn Kjellsby, actress
8 April – Odd Nerdrum, painter
9 April – Kåre Olav Berg, nordic combined skier (died 2007).
11 April – Terje Haugland, long jumper
14 April – Bjørn Atle Holter-Hovind, media and corporate executive.
18 April – Åse Gunhild Woie Duesund, politician
20 April 
Peter Butenschøn, architect and publicist.
Frank Olafsen, football player, bandy player and ice hockey player.
23 April 
Tore Milsett, cyclist.
Tore Sandberg, journalist, non-fiction writer and private investigator.
Terje Thoen, ice hockey player (died 2008).
25 April 
Berit Berthelsen, athlete (died 2022).
Einar Steen-Nøkleberg, classical pianist and musical pedagogue.
28 April – Magne Aarøen, politician (died 2003)
27 April 
Siri Austeng, politician (died 2017).
Bjørn Dyrdahl, luger.
30 April – Jon Bing, writer and law professor (died 2014).

May
 
 

2 May – Wenche Cumming, politician.
5 May – Arne Risa, long-distance runner who specialized in 3000 metres steeplechase and 10,000 metres.
6 May – Carl I. Hagen, politician
7 May – Eva Norvind, writer, documentary producer, director, sex therapist and actress (died 2006)
10 May – John Fredriksen, oil tanker and shipping tycoon
16 May – Jørgen Holte, politician
17 May – Harald Wigaard, gymnast.
24 May – Ivar Fonnes, civil servant, national archivist.
26 May – Jan Kinder, ice hockey player (died 2013).
27 May – Karen Fladset, handball player and coach.

June
 

1 June – Øyvind Nordsletten, diplomat
7 June – Kjartan Fløgstad, author
8 June – Ann-Mari Hvaal, artistic gymnast.
12 June – Bjørn Elvenes, ice hockey player (died 1988).
13 June – Bjørn Tveter, speed skater
15 June – Eva Lange, painter and printmaker (died 2017).
18 June – Ailo Gaup, Sámi shaman and author
19 June – Arne Holen, musicologist
28 June – Ellen Auensen, illustrator.
29 June – Lars Grini, ski jumper and Olympic bronze medallist

July
 
 

3 July – Sverre Mitsem, judge (died 2005)
4 July – Jan Erik Kongshaug, sound engineering, jazz guitarist, and composer
12 July – Kjell Kristian Rike, sports commentator (died 2008)
14 July – Jon Michelet, thriller and crime fiction writer (Orion's Belt), publisher, newspaper editor (Klassekampen) and politician (died 2018).
15 July – Trygve Retvik, artist.
18 July – Sverre Anker Ousdal, actor
19 July – Jan Reinås, businessperson (died 2010).
23 July – Arne Mikkelsen, ice hockey player.
25 July – Svein Erik Nilsen, rower.
27 July – Johan C. Løken, politician (died 2017).
31 July – Knut Einar Eriksen, historian

August
 

1 August – Tom Christensen, ice hockey player.
4 August – Nina Sundbye, sculptor.
5 August – Lars Myraune, military officer and politician.
11 August – Inger Nordal, botanist.
14 August – Åge Hadler, orienteer (world champion 1966, 1970).
28 August – Katharina Mo-Berge, cross-country skier.

September
 

7 September – Britt Mjaasund Øyen, ice sledge speed racer.
9 September – Finn Urdal, handball player.
13 September – Halvor Moxnes, theologian.
20 September – Siri Frost Sterri, politician.
27 September – Villy Haugen, speed skater and Olympic bronze medallist.
29 September – Sven Kroken, curler.

October
  

1 October – Yngvar Numme, singer, actor, revue writer and director.
8 October – Didrik Tønseth, diplomat and lawyer.
9 October – Jan Fredrik Wiborg, civil engineer (died 1994)
11 October – Bernt Albert, politician.
12 October – Øivind Andersen, philologist.
13 October – Hans Olav Østgaard, jurist and civil servant.
14 October – Svein Flåtten, politician
17 October – Leiv Nergaard, businessperson
18 October – Finn Seemann, international soccer player (died 1985)
23 October – Liv Lundberg, author (died 2022).
29 October – Geir Henning Braaten, pianist.

November
 

5 November 
Asmund Kristoffersen, politician
Håkon Mjøen, alpine skier.
8 November – Else Mundal, philologist.
9 November – Else Bugge Fougner, lawyer and a politician.
11 November 
Tore Berger, sprint canoer, Olympic gold medallist and World Champion
Per Ivar Moe, speed skater and Olympic silver medallist
12 November – Tore Hem, sport wrestler.
18 November – Unni Wikan, professor of social anthropology.
24 November – Brit Vingelsgaard Ryen, politician.
26 November 
Anstein Gjengedal, police chief.
Kjellbjørg Lunde, politician

December
 
 

1 December – Nils Ole Oftebro, actor.
3 December – Jan Johansen, sprint canoer, Olympic gold medallist and World Champion
4 December – Ernst Wroldsen, politician.
8 December – Beate Audum Mulholland, children's writer (died 1994).
10 December – Oddgeir Bruaset, journalist and non-fiction writer.
13 December – Ursula Evje, politician
14 December – Jon Terje Øverland, alpine skier.
16 December – Bjørn Ransve, painter and printmaker.
26 December 
Lasse Hamre, alpine skier.
Børre Rognlien, sports official and politician.
27 December – John M. Jacobsen, film producer
31 December – Kristin Hille Valla, politician and Minister

Full date unknown
Jiri Hlinka, music professor and piano teacher
Stein H. Annexstad, businessperson and politician
Ole T. Berg, political scientist
Sven G. Eliassen, historian
Øystein Josefsen, businessperson and politician
Bjørn Myrseth, biologist and businessperson
Nic. Nilsen, businessperson
Åsmund Reikvam, professor in medicine and former politician
Aud Talle, social anthropologist
Torkel Wetterhus, businessperson and politician

Deaths

23 January – Edvard Munch, painter and printmaker (born 1863).
19 February – Reidar Haave Olsen, pilot (born 1923)
25 April – Olav Nielsen, boxer (born 1902)
12 June – Einar Hærland, military officer, executed (born 1909)
24 June – Sigurd Roll, diplomat and former sprinter (born 1893)
8 August – Ragnvald Hvoslef, politician (born 1872)
14 October – Torleif Torkildsen, gymnast and Olympic bronze medallist (born 1892)
13 November – Gregers Gram, resistance fighter and saboteur (born 1917)
5 December – Michael Hansson, judge (born 1875).
12 December – Alf Hjort, electrical engineer in America (born 1877)

Full date unknown
Haakon Martin Five, politician and Minister (born 1880)
Alfred Klingenberg, pianist (born 1867)
Odd Sverressøn Klingenberg, politician and Minister (born 1871)

See also

References

External links